Athletics competitions at the 1997 South Pacific Mini Games were held at the Veterans Memorial Stadium in Pago Pago, American Samoa, between August 15–20, 1997.

A total of 42 events were contested, 23 by men and 19 by women.

Medal summary
Medal winners and their results were published on the Athletics Weekly webpage
courtesy of Tony Isaacs and Børre Lilloe, and on the Oceania Athletics Association webpage by Bob Snow.

Complete results can also be found on the Oceania Athletics Association, and on the Athletics PNG webpages.

Men

Women

Medal table
The medal table was published.

Participation (unofficial)
Athletes from the following 15 countries were reported to participate:

 
 
 
 
 
 
 
 
 
 
 
 
/

References

External links
Pacific Games Council
Oceania Athletics Association

Athletics at the Pacific Mini Games
Athletics in American Samoa
South Pacific Mini Games
1997 in American Samoan sports
1997 Pacific Games